The 2001–02 NBA season was the 14th season for the Miami Heat in the National Basketball Association. During the off-season, the Heat re-acquired Chris Gatling from the Cleveland Cavaliers, and signed free agents Rod Strickland, LaPhonso Ellis, Kendall Gill, then later on signed Jim Jackson in December. After dealing with a kidney disorder, Alonzo Mourning returned for a full season. However, he was not able to play up to the same level as the Heat struggled and lost 23 of their first 28 games, including a 12-game losing streak between November and December. They would recover from their awful start and play above .500 for the remainder of the season, winning nine of their next twelve games. However, the Heat finished sixth in the Atlantic Division with a 36–46 record, missing the playoffs for the first time since the 1994–95 season. 

Eddie Jones led the team with 18.3 points and 1.4 steals per game, while Mourning averaged 15.7 points, 8.4 rebounds and 2.5 blocks per game, and was selected for the 2002 NBA All-Star Game. In addition, Jackson contributed 10.7 points per game off the bench, while Strickland provided the team with 10.4 points and 6.1 assists per game, and Brian Grant provided with 9.3 points and 8.0 rebounds per game. This season proved to be Mourning's last season in a Heat uniform, and although he was on the roster the following season, he was unable to play due to another kidney condition. He would return to the Heat midway through the 2004–05 season after a brief stint with the New Jersey Nets. This season also marks the first time in Pat Riley's coaching career that he failed to get his team into the playoffs.

Following the season, Gill signed as a free agent with the Minnesota Timberwolves, while Jackson signed with the Sacramento Kings during the next season, Strickland was released to free agency, and Gatling retired. For the season, the Heat added new red alternate road uniforms with black side panels, which remained in use until 2010, while the shorts were slightly redesigned in 2009.

Offseason

Draft picks

Roster

Regular season

Season standings

Record vs. opponents

Player statistics

Season

Awards and records

Transactions

References

Miami Heat seasons
Miami Heat
Miami Heat
Miami Heat